William Henry Hamlyn FRIBA (16 February 1889 – 1968) was an architect based in England noted for his buildings for the London Midland and Scottish Railway.

He was born in Wigan in Lancashire. He studied architecture with Reginald Wynn Owen in Liverpool and later at the Royal Academy School.

He entered railway service in 1911 initially with the London and North Western Railway. He was elected a fellow of the Royal Institute of British Architects in 1934 and became the chief architect for the London, Midland and Scottish Railway company. He drew up plans with Percy Thomas for the rebuilding of Euston railway station in 1936, but the outbreak of the Second World War resulted in their cancellation

He designed a series of pre-fabricated railway stations which were built on blitz-damaged station sites from 1945 onwards. A prototype was erected at Queen’s Park railway station and the first installation was destined for Bootle New Strand railway station.

He retired in 1949 and died in 1968.

List of works

References

20th-century English architects
1889 births
1968 deaths
British railway architects
Fellows of the Royal Institute of British Architects
People from Wigan
Architects from Greater Manchester